Stig Henrik Hoff (born 4 February 1965) is a Norwegian actor. He was born in Vadsø but grew up in Berlevåg and Darbu. He is the son of Norwegian singer and writer Trygve Henrik Hoff.

Selected filmography

Film

Television

References

External links
 
 

1965 births
Living people
Norwegian male film actors
People from Vadsø
Norwegian male television actors